Sobekhotep III (throne name: Sekhemre-sewadjtawy) was an Egyptian king of the Thirteenth Dynasty of Egypt who reigned three to four years, c. 1740 BC or 1700 BC.

Family

Parents and siblings

The family of the king is known from several sources. A monument from Sehel Island shows Sobekhotep with his father Mentuhotep, his mother was king's mother Iuhetibu (Yauheyebu), his brothers Seneb and Khakau, and a half-sister called Reniseneb. Reniseneb was a daughter of Iuhetibu and her second husband Dedusobek.

Wife and children
Sobekhotep III had two wives, Senebhenas and Neni. A stela from Koptos (Qift), now in the Louvre (C 8), mentions the daughters of Neni: Iuhetibu Fendy and Dedetanqet. Iuhetibu Fendy wrote her name in a cartouche. This is the second time in Egyptian history that a king's daughter received this honor.

Senebhenas is shown with Sobekhotep on an altar in Sehel Island and a stela in Wadi el-Hol. The stela depicts Sobekhotep III before the god Monthu. He receives an ankh and a was-scepter from the god. Sobekhotep is followed by his father Montuhotep, his mother Iuhetibu, and his wife Senebhenas.

Reign
Sobekhotep III is known from many objects despite the fact that the Turin King List gives him a reign of only four years and two to four months in length. He added inscriptions to the temple of Menthu at Madamud and built a chapel at El Kab. On Sehel an altar with his name was found.

A number of scarab seals have been found that were from an officier of the ruler's table Sobekhotep begotten of the officier of the ruler's table Mentuhotep. It is possible that these seals belonged to Sobekhotep III before he became king.

Sobekhotep III was the first of a group of Thirteenth Dynasty kings about whom there exists historical records. This group of Thirteenth Dynasty kings are all known from many objects. These kings produced many seals and there are many private monuments that can be dated to these reigns. This would seem to indicate that Egypt was relatively stable during this period.

See also
List of pharaohs

References

Bibliography
K.S.B. Ryholt, The Political Situation in Egypt during the Second Intermediate Period, c. 1800-1550 BC, (Carsten Niebuhr Institute Publications, vol. 20. Copenhagen: Museum Tusculanum Press, 1997), 343-44, File 13/26.

External links

Sobekhotep III

18th-century BC Pharaohs
Pharaohs of the Thirteenth Dynasty of Egypt